Sainte-Anne-des-Lacs is a municipality in the  regional county municipality of Les Pays-d'en-Haut in Quebec, Canada, located in the administrative region of Laurentides. The municipality was founded in 1946 and was assigned the municipal number 77035 by the Quebec government. The Roman Catholic parish of Sainte-Anne-des-Lacs was founded in 1940.

Demographics 

Public services

The postal code for Sainte-Anne-des-Lacs is J0R 1B0. The municipality is served by a post office located inside a building supplies store and two rural routes.

Telephone service is provided through a Bell Canada telephone exchange at Prévost.

Police services are provided by the Sûreté du Québec, Quebec's provincial police force, and were formerly provided by the Régie intermunicipale de police de la Rivière-du-Nord, which also served Piedmont, Prévost  and some other communities in the Laurentians.

The Municipality has its own fire department. A new fire station building near the town hall was expected to be open in July 2015.

Politics
 Mayor:  Catherine Hamé Mulcair
 Secretary-Treasurer: Christiane Côté.
 Member of Parliament:
Marc-André Morin (NDP).
 Member of the National Assembly of Quebec: Claude Cousineau (Parti Québécois).

Lac Marois Country Club

The Lac Marois Country Club, located on the shores of Lac Marois, is a members only club open from late June to the end of August.

It was founded in 1903 for outdoor church services. Land was donated in 1910 and the Lac Marois Union Church was built. The Lac Marois Country Club came into being in 1929, as a means to fulfill more than spiritual needs, and requested the church grant them the right to build a clubhouse on church property.

The Union Church owns the property and leases the land to the Interlake Youth Club, the parent company of the Lac Marois Country Club.

At L.M.C.C. (Lac Marois Country Club), children can take lessons. Lessons include swimming (lessons and swimteam), tennis, sailing, canoeing, and junior club.

Education

Sir Wilfrid Laurier School Board operates Anglophone public schools:
 Morin Heights Elementary School in Morin-Heights serves a portion of the town
 Laurentian Regional High School in Lachute

See also
Lake Guindon
List of parish municipalities in Quebec

References

 Commission de la toponymie du Québec. Sainte-Anne-des-Lacs (Municipalité de paroisse) Retrieved May 22, 2006.
 
 Statistics Canada
 The Atlas of Canada
 House of Commons, Canada

External links 
Sainte-Anne-des-Lacs
Bibliothèque de Sainte-Anne-des-Lacs - Réseau BIBLIO des Laurentides 
Tourisme Pays-d'en-Haut 
Centre local de développement des Pays-d'en-Haut
Centre local de développement des Pays-d'en-Haut. List of communities 
 Statistics Canada. 2002. 2001 Community profiles. Sainte-Anne-des-Lacs
Comité des Citoyens de Sainte-Anne-des-Lacs

Parish municipalities in Quebec
Incorporated places in Laurentides